Daniel Houser (born November 1973) is an English video game producer, writer, and voice actor, as well as the co-founder (along with his brother Sam) and former vice president of creativity for Rockstar Games. As well as producing video games, Houser was the head writer for Rockstar Games, being the lead for Bully (2006), Red Dead Redemption (2010) and Max Payne 3 (2012). He has also written, or co-written, almost all of the titles in the Grand Theft Auto series.

Biography
Daniel Houser was born in London in November 1973, the son of British lawyer Walter Houser and actress Geraldine Moffat. Houser studied geography. Despite wanting to be musicians, both Houser and his brother Sam had a fascination with storytelling from a young age. Growing up near a video library in London, they watched many American crime and cult films and Spaghetti Westerns. Houser has stated he is a fan of Walter Hill's film The Warriors, and Rockstar Games went on to release a video game version of The Warriors in 2005. In 1995, Houser got a part-time job at BMG Interactive testing CD-ROMs; he became a full-time employee until 1996. Dan and Sam later became interested in a video game called Race'n'Chase which was being developed by DMA Design after getting a preview of the game. The Housers signed Race'n'Chase to BMG Interactive as the publisher and changed the name of the game to Grand Theft Auto. Following the sale of BMG Interactive to Take-Two in 1998, Houser and his brother moved with the company to New York, where they founded Rockstar Games. He has cited the 3D Mario and Zelda games on the Nintendo 64 as influences on his work.

Houser has been credited as a producer for five Grand Theft Auto games, and also worked as a writer and voice artist for the series. Despite the high profile of the Grand Theft Auto series, Houser and his brother have shied away from the celebrity spotlight, preferring to focus on the Rockstar Games brand rather than giving any one person the credit for the games' success. In 2009, both Dan and Sam Houser appeared in Time magazine's 100 most influential people of 2009 list. In 2012, he bought a house in Brooklyn that once belonged to author Truman Capote.

In February 2020, Rockstar Games's parent company, Take-Two Interactive, announced Houser's resignation from Rockstar Games. He left Rockstar on 11 March 2020, following an extended break in 2019. In August 2020, he bought a  estate in the Brentwood neighborhood of Los Angeles. In February 2021, Houser registered two companies in Delaware: Absurd Ventures LLC and Absurd Ventures in Games LLC, the latter with a subsidiary based in Altrincham. Houser is listed as the company's producer and creative director. By September 2022, Houser joined the advisory board of Revolving Games, a blockchain game studio, after investing in a  funding round for the company; Houser met co-founder Saad Zaeem some years earlier to explore ideas, but they ultimately chose different projects, leading Houser to become an adviser and investor instead.

Works

References

External links
 

1973 births
Academy of Interactive Arts & Sciences Hall of Fame inductees
English expatriates in the United States
English male voice actors
Living people
People educated at St Paul's School, London
Rockstar Games
Video game producers
Video game writers